Salonina was the cognomen of Roman empress Cornelia Salonina, wife of Emperor Gallienus. The name Salonina is also sometimes incorrectly given as the first name of Salonia Matidia, niece of emperor Trajan.